Elias Keyes (April 14, 1758July 9, 1844) was an American politician and judge. He served as a U.S. Representative from Vermont.

Biography
Keyes was born in Ashford in the Connecticut Colony. He attended the common schools and later read law.

Keyes enlisted in the Continental Army during the American Revolution, and rose to the rank of sergeant major.

In 1780 he moved to Barnard, Vermont.  In 1785, he accepted an offer of 400 acres for whoever constructed the first gristmill and sawmill in Stockbridge, Vermont, and he was one of the town's first settlers.

Keyes served in the Vermont House of Representatives from 1793 until 1796, 1798 until 1802, 1818, 1820 and 1823 until 1825.

He was a member of the Governor's council from 1805 until 1813 and from 1815 until 1817. In 1814 Keyes was a member of the Vermont state constitutional convention. From 1803 until 1814 he served as assistant judge of the Windsor County, Vermont Court, and from 1815 until 1818 he served as judge of Windsor County.

Keyes was elected a Democratic-Republican to the Seventeenth United States Congress, serving from March 4, 1821 until March 3, 1823.

Business reverses and debts after his term in Congress caused Keyes to move to Norfolk, New York.  He later returned to Stockbridge and was able to restart his gristmill and sawmill.

He died in Stockbridge on July 9, 1844, and was interred in Stockbridge's Maplewood Cemetery.

References

Further reading
 "Gazetteer and Business Directory of Windsor County, Vt., for 1883-84, Volume 1", printed by The Journal Office, 1884.

External links
 
 Biographical Directory of the United States Congress
 
 Govtrack.us
 The Political Graveyard

1758 births
1844 deaths
People from Ashford, Connecticut
Vermont state court judges
Members of the Vermont House of Representatives
Democratic-Republican Party members of the United States House of Representatives from Vermont
People of colonial Connecticut
Burials in Vermont
American lawyers admitted to the practice of law by reading law